Kim Mikkelsen (born 24 November 1965) is a retired Danish football midfielder.

References

1965 births
Living people
Danish men's footballers
Boldklubben Frem players
Herfølge Boldklub players
FC Roskilde players
F.C. Copenhagen players
Association football midfielders
Danish Superliga players
Denmark under-21 international footballers
Sportspeople from Frederiksberg